Stefan Oschmann (born 25 July 1957) is a German businessman.

Biography
Born in Würzburg, Germany, Oschmann earned his doctorate in veterinary medicine from the Ludwig Maximilian University of Munich.  Oschmann started his career at an agency of the International Atomic Energy Agency. In 1987, he started working for the German Animal Health Federation (Bundesverband für Tiergesundheit), the trade association for German manufacturers of veterinary drugs and feed additives.

From 1989 to 2011, Oschmann worked for Merck Sharp & Dohme (MSD), the European operations of Merck & Co. He was managing director of MSD Austria from 1994, vice president for Central and Eastern Europe from 1998, vice president of MSD Europe and managing director of MSD Germany from 1999, senior vice president for worldwide human health marketing from 2005, president for Europe, the Middle East, Africa, and Canada from 2006 and finally MSD's president of emerging markets from 2009 to 2011.

Oschmann joined the Merck Group as a member of the executive board in 2011.  He was responsible for the healthcare business sector until the end of 2014. He became vice chairman of the executive board and deputy CEO of the Merck Group in 2015.  Oschmann became the chairman of the executive board and CEO of the Merck Group in April 2016, succeeding Karl-Ludwig Kley.  He stood down as Merck CEO at the end of April 2021.

In May 2021, AiCuris AG announced the appointment of Oschmann as the new chair of its supervisory board.

Other activities

Corporate boards
 Allianz, Member of the Joint Advisory Board

Non-profit organizations
 European Federation of Pharmaceutical Industries and Associations (EPFIA), President (since 2017)  
 Baden-Badener Unternehmer-Gespräche (BBUG), Member of the Board of Trustees
 Deutsche Welle, Member of the Business Advisory Board
 Deutsches Museum, Member of the Board of Trustees
 European Round Table of Industrialists (ERT), Member
 German Chemical Industry Association (VCI), Member of the Executive Committee 
 Max Planck Institute for Medical Research, Member of the Board of Trustees
 Munich Security Conference, Member of the Advisory Council
 International Federation of Pharmaceutical Manufacturers & Associations (IFPMA), President (2014-2016)

Personal life
Oschmann and his wife have two children.

References

Living people
German chief executives
International Atomic Energy Agency officials
Merck Group people
Merck & Co. people
1957 births
German veterinarians
Ludwig Maximilian University of Munich alumni
German chairpersons of corporations
Chief executives in the pharmaceutical industry